Shadraj, also known as Shahraj, may refer to:
 Shadraj-e Olya